The 1987 Australian federal election was held in Australia on 11 July 1987, following the granting of a double dissolution on 5 June by the Governor-General Sir Ninian Stephen. Consequently, all 148 seats in the House of Representatives as well as all 76 seats in the Senate were up for election. The incumbent Australian Labor Party, led by Prime Minister Bob Hawke, defeated the opposition Liberal Party of Australia, led by John Howard and the National Party of Australia led by Ian Sinclair. This was the first, and to date only, time the Labor Party won a third consecutive election.

Future Opposition Leader John Hewson entered parliament at this election.

Since the introduction in the previous election in 1984 of leaders' debates, this was the only election in which there was not at least one leaders' debate due to Hawke's refusal to debate Howard.

Background
The Hawke Government had been in power since the general election of 1983, and had been re-elected in the snap election of 1984, although with a decreased majority. Hawke, in partnership with Treasurer Paul Keating, had pursued an ambitiously reformist agenda over the course of his time in office, which included floating the Australian dollar, reducing tariffs on imports and completely reforming the tax system. However, the government's popularity dropped sharply throughout the course of its 1984–87 term, mostly due to a series of blunders such as its failed 'tax summit' (designed to gain support for Keating's proposed consumption tax), and declining terms of trade, which Treasurer Keating argued threatened to reduce Australia to the status of a banana republic unless tough measures were taken to correct the balance of trade.

Meanwhile, for much of the 1984–87 term, the opposition Liberal-National coalition led in the polls, leading to speculation that it could regain office in 1987. However, both coalition parties were also wracked by infighting throughout the parliament. In September 1985, Andrew Peacock, who had led the party to a surprising rebound in the 1984 general election, was replaced as leader of the Liberal party by the then Deputy Leader and Shadow Treasurer John Howard, after a botched effort to remove the latter from the Deputy Leadership and replace him with Queenslander John Moore, resulting in Peacock's resignation. Nonetheless, the party remained divided, as Howard was seen by some Liberals as being too far to the right, and these opponents of the Howard policy agenda rallied to Peacock, who was eventually sacked from the shadow ministry in March 1987, following unfortunate remarks regarding Howard by Peacock to Victorian state opposition leader Jeff Kennett in an infamous car phone conversation.

Moreover, Howard and National Party leader Ian Sinclair faced challenges from the right as well as the left of the coalition, in the form of Queensland premier Sir Joh Bjelke-Petersen. Premier since 1968, Bjelke-Petersen was a hardline conservative who aggressively opposed the "socialist" Hawke Labor government, and believed that he could transfer the style of politics that had served him so well in his native Queensland to the federal stage. Following a decisive electoral victory in Queensland in 1986, the so-called Joh for Canberra campaign began in earnest, supported by much of the Queensland business establishment (the infamous "white shoe brigade"), with Bjelke-Petersen announcing that he intended to run for the Prime Ministership on 1 January 1987. At the end of February 1987, the Queensland National Party decided to withdraw its twelve federal members of parliament from the Coalition, and demanded that federal National Party leader Ian Sinclair also withdraw because of "basic differences in taxation and other philosophies and policies" between the Liberal and National parties. Within the Queensland National Party, the party president Sir Robert Sparkes enforced support for Bjelke-Petersen, making practical opposition within the Queensland ranks unlikely. The Coalition formally split in early May, with the National Party voting to break the federal coalition, and Ian Sinclair looking increasingly impotent and unable to ensure the loyalty of National Party members. However, it was at this point that Bob Sparkes reneged on his loyalty to Bjelke-Petersen and withdrew from the campaign. With his pool of supporters steadily decreasing, the likelihood of an effective challenge to the federal Coalition from Bjelke-Petersen began to collapse. When the election was called on 27 May, Bjelke-Petersen was in the United States, and quickly decided to withdraw from his bid for federal power. However, the federal coalition had been broken, and Howard's credibility as a challenger to the Hawke government had been severely damaged.

Campaign

The 1987 federal election was called 6 months early by Prime Minister Hawke to capitalise on the aforementioned disunity in the opposition. The nominal trigger for the double dissolution was the rejection of legislation for the Australia Card by the Senate, but it did not figure prominently in the campaign, and Labor Senate Leader John Button even burst into laughter when referring to it in his speech announcing the election. Caught off guard by the early election, the opposition quickly ran into difficulties when the funding for its flagship tax cut proposals was revealed to have been miscalculated by some $540 million (at the time), a mistake brought up by the Labor party and conceded by Howard. Furthermore, although the Joh for Canberra push had been abandoned, the resulting schism between the Nationals and Liberals led to several three-cornered contests and the National Party ran independent Senate tickets in every state except New South Wales. Labor therefore chose to campaign strongly on the disunity amongst the opposition parties, contrasting it with the relative unity of purpose of the Labor Government. However, aside from these issues, the 1987 campaign failed to generate great excitement on the part of the electorate, and the opposition was viewed as unlikely (particularly in view of the infighting that had recently taken place on the conservative side of politics) to be able to remove the Labor party from power. This was a view strengthened by much of the polling during the campaign, which generally showed Labor with a commanding lead. This election was the last time the Liberals and Nationals competed directly against each other in a federal election.

Results

House of Representatives results

Senate results

 This was the first election in which the AEC conducted a special recount (under 1983 legislation) for the purpose of allocating three- and six-year senate terms. The recount results were not used.

Seats changing hands

 Members listed in italics did not contest their seat at this election.

Analysis
Hawke led Labor to a record third successive term in government, despite finishing slightly behind the Coalition in the first-preference vote (the first time that a party had won an election in spite of this since 1969), and suffering a swing of some 0.9% to the Coalition in the two-party-preferred vote. Nonetheless, Labor's result of 86 seats was the party's highest ever (the total number of seats was expanded by 23 in 1984), and the party made particularly strong gains in Bjelke-Petersen's native Queensland, gaining four seats to bring their Queensland tally to 13 of 24 seats. The Liberals suffered a net loss of two seats, primarily due to losses in Queensland, although they did make small gains in Howard's native New South Wales and in Victoria. The federal National Party also suffered a net loss of two seats, failing to expand upon its traditional rural base and hampered by disunity within its ranks.

This was the most recent election in which every seat in the House of Representatives was won by either Labor or the Coalition. Following the election, John Howard stayed on as leader of the Liberal Party, and would eventually become Prime Minister in 1996. However, the experience of the 1987 campaign is said to have been the origin of his oft-repeated remark that, in politics, "disunity is death". Meanwhile, Hawke would go on to win a fourth-consecutive election for the Labor party, but was eventually replaced as Labor leader and Prime Minister by Paul Keating in 1991.

See also
 Candidates of the Australian federal election, 1987
 Members of the Australian House of Representatives, 1987-1990
 Members of the Australian Senate, 1987-1990

Notes

References

Bibliography

Further reading
University of WA  election results in Australia since 1890
AEC 2PP vote
AustralianPolitics.com election details
Green, P. and Maley, M.,The Australian general election of 1987, Electoral Studies, Volume 7, Issue 1, April 1988, Pages 67–69.

1987 elections in Australia
Bob Hawke
Federal elections in Australia
July 1987 events in Australia